The Rose Land Park Plat Historic District encompasses an early 20th-century neighborhood of East Providence, Rhode Island, most of which was built by a single development group.  It is located on the west side of Willett Avenue (Rhode Island Route 103), on Florence Street, Princeton and Dartmouth Avenues, and Roseland Court.  The  district includes 38 residential buildings, and was mostly built between 1928 and 1939 as a streetcar suburb of Providence by Severin Carlson and Carl Johnson.  The houses are mainly wood-frame construction, and are stylistically English Revival, Colonial Revival, and traditional Cape Cod.

The district was listed on the National Register of Historic Places in 2015.

See also
National Register of Historic Places listings in Providence County, Rhode Island

References

Historic districts in Providence County, Rhode Island
East Providence, Rhode Island
Historic districts on the National Register of Historic Places in Rhode Island
National Register of Historic Places in Providence County, Rhode Island